Peter Connolly (1 January 1868 — 1 September 1895) was a Scottish footballer who played for Royal Arsenal as a forward or full back, and later for Royal Ordnance Factories in 1893. After a successful career with both clubs, he died of tuberculosis in 1895. at the age of 27.

Career

Arsenal 
Peter Connolly is widely regarded as one of Royal Arsenal's best players during his time at the club. He made his debut against local rivals Tottenham Hotspur in a 6-2 victory, scoring 4 goals. He made 20 appearances in the 1888-89 season, scoring 19 goals in all competitions, and 13 goals in 7 competitive fixtures, finishing as top scorer for the club. following this season he moved into a more defensive fullback position, though over the next 2 seasons continued to play regularly, playing in 82 games and scoring another 12 goals in all friendlies and competitions for Arsenal, playing in this position for the club's very first FA Cup fixture. Whilst playing for Arsenal, he won the Kent Senior Cup, London Charity Cup, and finished runner's up in the London Senior Cup. In total he made 6 appearances in the FA Cup. In total he scored 52 goals in 129 appearances for the club.

Royal Ordnance Factory 
In 1893, Connolly applied for, and had his professional status removed so that he could leave the Royal Arsenal and play for rival amateur side, Royal Ordnance Factories He won his second Kent Senior Cup winners medal, before moving back to Kirkcaldy after the season ended, due to poor health.

References 

1868 births
1895 deaths
Footballers from Kirkcaldy
Scottish footballers
Arsenal F.C. players
Association football forwards
Association football fullbacks
19th-century deaths from tuberculosis
Tuberculosis deaths in Scotland